Fabio Espinosa (born 13 June 1948) is a Colombian former footballer who competed in the 1972 Summer Olympics.

References

1948 births
Living people
Association football midfielders
Colombian footballers
Olympic footballers of Colombia
Footballers at the 1972 Summer Olympics
Deportes Tolima footballers